Hazara may refer to:

Ethnic groups 
 The Hazaras, a Persian-speaking people of Afghanistan, Pakistan and Iran
 Aimaq Hazara,  Aimaq's subtribe of Hazara origin
 Hazarawal, a Hindko-speaking people of the Hazara region of northern Pakistan
 Hazara-i-Karlugh

Places

Afghanistan 
 Hazaristan or Hazarajat, a historic region of Afghanistan

Pakistan 
 Hazara, Pakistan, a region in the Khyber Pakhtunkhwa province
 Hazara Division, an administrative division
 Hazara District, a former district (until 1976)
 Hazara University, in Mansehra, Khyber Pakhtunkhwa
 Hazara, Swat, a village in Swat District, Khyber Pakhtunkhwa
 Hazara Town, an area on the outskirts of Quetta, Balochistan
 Takht Hazara, a village in Punjab

People with the name 
 Faiz Mohammad Kateb Hazara
 General Muhammad Musa Khan Hazara
 Abdul Khaliq Hazara (assassin)
 Abdul Khaliq Hazara (politician)
 Kulsoom Hazara (karateka)

See also 
 Hasara, a village in Nepal
 Hazara Expedition of 1888, a campaign by British India against rebelling tribes in the Hazara region
 Hazaran, a mountainous area in Iran
 Hazare, a surname

Language and nationality disambiguation pages